Kalan Ascher Reed (born December 29, 1993) is a former American football cornerback. He was Mr. Irrelevant in 2016 when the Tennessee Titans took him with the final pick of the seventh round of the 2016 NFL Draft. In college, Reed played for the Southern Miss Golden Eagles.

Early years
Reed attended Briarwood Christian School in Birmingham, Alabama.

College career
Reed played college football for the Southern Miss Golden Eagles from 2012 to 2015. In his freshmen season in 2012 he had 21 tackles and 1 interception. In his sophomore season in 2013 he had 41 tackles, 1 interception, and 1 forced fumble. In his junior season in 2014 he had 34 tackles and 2 interceptions. In his senior season in 2015 he had 47 tackles, 4 interceptions, and 1 forced fumble.

Professional career

Tennessee Titans
The Tennessee Titans selected Reed in the seventh round (253rd overall) of the 2016 NFL Draft, making him the 43rd Mr. Irrelevant.

On May 9, 2016, the Tennessee Titans signed Reed to a four-year, $2.39 million contract that includes a signing bonus of $58,540. On September 2, 2016, Reed was released by the Titans as part of final roster cuts and was signed to the practice squad the next day. On November 28, 2016, Reed was promoted to the active roster.

On August 20, 2018, Reed was placed on injured reserve after suffering a broken foot. He was released on August 27, 2018.

Seattle Seahawks
On October 3, 2018, Reed was signed to the Seattle Seahawks' practice squad. On November 6, 2018, Reed was promoted to the main roster.

On August 27, 2019, Reed was placed on injured reserve with a likely career-ending neck injury.

Reed did not receive a restricted free agent tender from the team after the season, and became a free agent on March 18, 2020.

References

1993 births
Living people
Players of American football from Dallas
American football cornerbacks
Southern Miss Golden Eagles football players
Tennessee Titans players
Seattle Seahawks players